Alfred Berglund may refer to:
 Alfred Berglund (admiral)
 Alfred Berglund (politician)